"Hello! (Good To Be Back)" is a song by German band Scooter. The song samples the refrain from Gary Glitter's 1973 single "Hello, Hello, I'm Back Again". It was released in October 2005 as the lead single from the album Who's Got the Last Laugh Now?.

Track listing
CD Single & Download
 "Hello (Good To Be Back)" [Radio Edit] (3:35)
 "Hello (Good To Be Back)" [Club Mix] (7:43)
 "Hello (Good To Be Back)" [Extended] (5:52)
 "Path" (3:36)

12"
 "Hello (Good To Be Back)" [Extended] (5:52)
 "Hello (Good To Be Back)" [Club Mix] (7:43)

Music video
The video for the song was shot in Chicago, Illinois, during the group's first tour of the United States.

Samples
"Hello! (Good To Be Back)" samples four songs. The main sample being from "Hello, Hello, I'm Back Again" by Gary Glitter from the 1973 album Touch Me. Additional samples are from "3 a.m. Eternal (Live At The S.S.L)" by The KLF from the 1991 album The White Room and "We Call It Acieed" by D Mob and Dark Night Rider by Ice MC.

Chart performance

References

Scooter (band) songs
2005 singles
Songs written by Mike Leander
Songs written by H.P. Baxxter
Songs written by Rick J. Jordan
2005 songs
Songs written by Jens Thele
Songs written by Gary Glitter